William Robert Bristowe (born 17 November 1963) is an English former cricketer.

Bristowe was born at Woking in November 1963. He was educated at Charterhouse School, before going up to St Edmund Hall, Oxford. While studying at Oxford, he made his debut in first-class cricket for Oxford University against Glamorgan at Oxford in 1984. He played first-class cricket for Oxford until 1985, making ten appearances. He scored a total of 260 runs in his ten matches at an average of 21.66, with a high score of 42 not out. In addition to playing first-class cricket while at Oxford, Bristowe also appeared in one List A one-day match for the Combined Universities cricket team in the 1985 Benson & Hedges Cup at Chelmsford, during which he was dismissed without scoring by Derek Pringle.

References

External links

1963 births
Living people
Sportspeople from Woking
People educated at Charterhouse School
Alumni of St Edmund Hall, Oxford
English cricketers
Oxford University cricketers
British Universities cricketers